() is one of the six letters the Arabic alphabet added to the twenty-two from the Phoenician alphabet (the others being , , ,). In Modern Standard Arabic it represents the voiceless dental fricative , also found in English as the "th" in words such as "thank" and "thin". 
In Persian, Urdu, and Kurdish it is pronounced as s as in "sister" in English.

Its numerical value is 500 (see Abjad numerals).

The Arabic letter  is named  ṯāʾ. It is written in several ways depending in its position in the word:

Pronunciation of the letter varies between and within the various varieties of Arabic: while it is consistently pronounced as the voiceless dental plosive  in Maghrebi Arabic (except Tunisian and eastern Libyan), on the other hand in the Arabic varieties of the Mashriq (in the broad sense, including Egyptian, Sudanese and Levantine) and Hejazi Arabic, it can be pronounced as either  or as the sibilant voiceless alveolar fricative . Regardless of these regional differences, the pattern of the speaker's variety of Arabic frequently intrudes into otherwise Modern Standard speech; this is widely accepted, and is the norm when speaking the mesolect known alternately as lugha wusṭā ("middling/compromise language") or ʿAmmiyyat/Dārijat al-Muṯaqqafīn ("Educated/Cultured Colloquial") used in the informal speech of educated Arabs of different countries.

When representing this sound in transliteration of Arabic into Hebrew, it is written as ת׳.

Common Semitic perspective
The choice of the letter  as the base for this letter was not due to etymology (see History of the Arabic alphabet), but rather due to phonetic similarity. For other Semitic cognates of the phoneme  see Sound changes between Proto-Semitic and the daughter languages.

Character encodings

See also
 Arabic phonology

Arabic letters